Sidharth Shukla (12 December 1980 – 2 September 2021) was an Indian actor, host and model who appeared in Hindi television and films. He was known for his roles in Balika Vadhu, Broken But Beautiful 3 and Dil Se Dil Tak. He emerged as the winner of reality shows Bigg Boss 13 and Fear Factor: Khatron Ke Khiladi 7. He hosted Savdhaan India and India's Got Talent. He won the World's Best Model title in December 2005 beating 40 other participants from across Asia, Latin America, and Europe. He made his acting debut with a lead role in the 2008 show Babul Ka Aangann Chootey Na. In 2014, Shukla made his Bollywood debut in a supporting role in Humpty Sharma Ki Dulhania.

Life and career

1980–2007: Early life and career beginnings 
Sidharth Shukla was born on 12 December 1980 into a Hindu Brahmin family in Bombay (present-day Mumbai) to Ashok Shukla, a civil engineer employed at the Reserve Bank of India and Rita Shukla, a homemaker. He lost his father because of a lung disease during his modelling days. He has two elder sisters. Shukla attended St. Xavier's High School, Fort, Mumbai and holds a bachelor's degree in Interior Design from Rachana Sansad School of Interior Design. Shukla has described himself as a very athletic child, and represented his school in tennis and football. He played against Italian football club, AC Milan’s under-19 team, on their Mumbai visit as part of Festa Italiana. After completing bachelor's degree in interior design, Shukla worked in an interior designing firm for a couple of years. In 2004, Shukla was runner-up in the Gladrags Manhunt and Megamodel Contest. He appeared in a video "Resham Ka Rumal" sung by Ila Arun. In 2005, he represented India at the World's Best Model contest held in Turkey, and became the first Indian, as well as the first Asian, to win the title beating 40 contestants from across Asia, Latin America, and Europe. After winning the title, he appeared in advertisements for Bajaj Avenger, ICICI and Digjam.

2008–2011: Television debut 

In 2008, he made his acting debut with a lead role in the television show Babul Ka Aangann Chootey Na on Sony TV  opposite Aastha Chaudhary. Shukla played Shubh Ranawat, a man dedicated to his work and family. The show ended in February 2009. In 2009, he appeared as Veer Vardhan Singh in Jaane Pehchaane Se... Ye Ajnabbi on Star One opposite Sanjeeda Sheikh and Aditi Tailang. The show ended in September 2010. After Jaane Pehchaane Se... Ye Ajnabbi ended, he also appeared in a few episodes of Aahat. In 2011, he appeared as Rahul Kashyap in Love U Zindagi opposite Pavitra Punia on StarPlus. The show was inspired by the Bollywood movie Jab We Met. He also appeared in an episode of CID.

2012–2014: Breakthrough with Balika Vadhu and Bollywood debut 

In 2012, Shukla appeared as District Collector Shivraj Shekhar, opposite Pratyusha Banerjee and Toral Rasputra in Balika Vadhu. It was his portrayal of Shiv in the long-running Colors TV social drama series Balika Vadhu which earned him widespread recognition and popularity, including several awards and nominations. He received the "GR8! Performer of the Year (Male)" award at the Indian Television Academy (ITA) Awards. He left the show in 2015, when his character, Shiv, died fighting with terrorists. In 2013, Shukla participated in the celebrity dance reality show Jhalak Dikhhla Jaa 6, and was eliminated in the 11th week. It was reported that Shukla had signed a 3-film-deal with Dharma Productions. In 2014, Shukla made his Bollywood debut in the romantic comedy Humpty Sharma Ki Dulhania in a supporting role playing the character of Angad Bedi, an NRI doctor and fiancé of the female protagonist played by Alia Bhatt. The film earned him an award for "Breakthrough Supporting Performance (Male)" in the 2015 Stardust Awards.

2014–2018: Television hosting, Khatron Ke Khiladi and Dil Se Dil Tak 
In 2014, Shukla was named the host of Savdhaan India. He introduced stories of common people who fought against crime. In 2015, after exiting from Balika Vadhu, he hosted India's Got Talent 6, with Bharti Singh, and the season finale was aired in June 2015. In 2016, Shukla won the stunt reality show Fear Factor: Khatron Ke Khiladi 7. The same year, he hosted India's Got Talent 7 with Bharti Singh, and the season finale was aired in July 2016. Later in 2016, Shukla appeared as Mr. Chakraborty, an Indian businessman, in a Kazakhstan movie, Business in Kazakhstan. In 2017, he appeared as Parth Bhanushali in Dil Se Dil Tak with co-stars Rashami Desai and Jasmin Bhasin. The series was inspired by the Bollywood movie, Chori Chori Chupke Chupke. He left the series in December 2017.

2019–2021: Bigg Boss 13 and Broken But Beautiful 3 

In 2019, he participated in the reality show Bigg Boss 13, and was declared the winner in February 2020. Ormax media rated Shukla to be the most popular contestant of Bigg Boss 13, ranking him as number one throughout 20 weeks. He was voted the most favourite contestant of Bigg Boss 13 in polls conducted by Hindustan Times, India TV News, and The Times of India. He was the most tweeted contestant of Bigg Boss 13. 

In 2020, after winning Bigg Boss 13, Shukla's massive popularity helped him bag appearances in two music videos, "Bhula Dunga", and "Dil Ko Karaar Aaya". The same year, Shukla entered as one of the "Toofani" Seniors in Bigg Boss 14, with Hina Khan and Gauahar Khan, for the first two weeks. Shukla then appeared in another music video "Shona Shona". In January 2021, Shukla hosted 16th week's "Weekend Ka Vaar" of Bigg Boss 14, as Shukla was filling in for Salman Khan, who was missing from the show due to other work commitments. 

Shukla made his OTT debut as Agastya Rao with the third season of the romance web series Broken But Beautiful opposite Sonia Rathee streaming on ALTBalaji and MX Player. The series and Shukla's performance received positive response from critics, Mugdha Kapoor of DNA India wrote, "It’s the fire and genuineness in Sidharth’s acting and freshness in Sonia’s performance that keeps the viewers glued and wanting to see more."

In the media 

In 2014, he won the Gold Awards Most Fit Actor award and was included in Rediff's Television's Top 10 Actors.  In 2013, Shukla entered the Times of India's Most Desirable Men of 2013 at 34th position, ranking 33rd in 2014, 44th in 2017, 41st in 2018, 15th in 2019, and 11th in 2020. He was ranked 5th and 7th in the Times of India's Top 20 Most Desirable Men on Television in 2017 and 2018 respectively, and then he was ranked 1st consecutively in The Times 20 Most Desirable Men on Television in 2019 and 2020. He was announced Hindustan Times Most Stylish TV Personality 2017. Later in the year, he was also placed at the 10th position in the exclusive list of Top 12 Indian Male Hotties of 2017 by Trendrr. 

In 2019, Shukla was the 9th most searched personality in India on Google. In 2021, he was declared The Times of India's Charismatic TV personality. Before Bigg Boss 14 premiere, Sidharth was voted as the  Bigg Boss Greatest Of All Times in a series of polls conducted by Colors TV, where 16 popular contestants across all the previous 13 seasons were nominated for the title.

Death 
Shukla died on 2 September 2021 after suffering a heart attack at the age of 40. Shukla's family consisted of his mother and two sisters. His family informed the Mumbai Police, that Shukla was not under mental stress and they did not suspect any foul play in his death. His family also appealed his fans to not spread rumours about his death.

Filmography

Films

Web series

Television

Special appearances

Music videos

Awards and nominations

See also 
 List of Indian television actors
 List of Indian film actors

References

External links

 
 

1980 births
2021 deaths
21st-century Indian male actors
Male actors from Maharashtra
Best Model of the World winners
Bigg Boss (Hindi TV series) contestants
Big Brother (franchise) winners
Fear Factor: Khatron Ke Khiladi participants
Indian male film actors
Indian male models
Indian male soap opera actors
Indian male television actors
Indian television presenters
Male actors from Mumbai
Male actors in Hindi cinema
Participants in Indian reality television series